Hi™ How Are You Today? is an album by Canadian fiddler Ashley MacIsaac, released in 1995 on A&M Records' Ancient Music imprint. MacIsaac's major label debut and his most commercially and critically successful album, it spawned the Canadian Top 40 hit "Sleepy Maggie" featuring Mary Jane Lamond, and won the Juno Award for Roots & Traditional Album of the Year – Solo at the Juno Awards of 1996.

The album was produced by Michael Phillip Wojewoda and Peter Prilesnik. Guest musicians on the album included Lamond, Gordie Johnson, Graeme Kirkland, Ian Blurton, Chin Injeti, Gordie Sampson, Chris Brown, Gerry Deveau and the bands Jale and Quartetto Gelato.

In 2005, the tenth anniversary of the album's release, it was re-released as a special edition, remastered and released with four new remixes of MacIsaac's most famous track, "Sleepy Maggie", along with the music video for the track.

Track listing
 "Beaton's Delight" (2:34), 
 "Sleepy Maggie" (5:35), Mary Jane Lamond/traditional
 "Rusty D-con-STRUCK-tion" (3:00), traditional
 "The Devil in the Kitchen" (2:25), traditional
 "MacDougall's Pride" (5:03), Ashley MacIsaac, Gordie Sampson
 "Spoonboy" (5:38), traditional
 "What an Idiot He Is" (4:29), Bob Snider
 "Sophia's Pipes" (3:16), traditional
 "Sad Wedding Day" (3:15), Barbara Allen, Mary Jane Lamond
 "Wing-Stock" (5:01), Stephen Cooney, traditional
 "Hills of Glenorchy" (4:16), traditional
 "Brenda Stubbert" (2:27), 
 "Catherine Cries" (6:00) – hidden track, not listed on cover. (aka Kill Your Foes), Jerry Holland

Special Edition "Sleepy Maggie" Remixes
 "The Sandman Mix" (5:33)
 "The Deep Sleep Mix" (7:26)
 "The BKS Chameleon Boom Mix 1" (6:33)
 "The BKS Chameleon Boom Mix 2" (4:52)

References

1995 albums
Ashley MacIsaac albums
Albums produced by Michael Phillip Wojewoda
Albums recorded at Metalworks Studios
Juno Award for Roots & Traditional Album of the Year – Solo albums